Rich Man is a 2018 television series starring Kim Jun-myeon, Ha Yeon-soo, Oh Chang-suk and Kim Ye-won. It is a remake of the 2012 Japanese television series Rich Man, Poor Woman. The drama is aired on MBN and Dramax starting May 9, 2018 on Wednesdays and Thursdays at 23:00 (KST) time slot.

Synopsis
This is a romance story about Lee Yoo-chan (Kim Jun-myeon), a genius programmer and CEO of IT company Next In who can't recognize the face of his first love, Kim Boon-hong, because of his facial recognition disability and Kim Bo-ra (Ha Yeon-soo), a college student who has an AlphaGo-like memory and is an aspiring job-seeker.  At a recruitment meeting for dozens of people aspiring to work at Next In, Yoo-chan humiliates many of the attendees and in particular picks on Bo-ra, even after she spectacularly demonstrates her remarkable memory.  But instead of slinking away like many of the applicants, she stands up to him. Just before he makes her leave, after sarcastically nicknaming her the "Queen of Rote Memory", she tells him that her name is Kim Boon-hong. This troubles Yoo-chan.  A couple of days later, Next In executives decide they need to employ someone with a photographic memory.  They search for Kim Boon-hong's resume but although they cannot find it at first, Min Tae-joo (Oh Chang-suk), Yoo-chan's friend and company co-founder, recognizes Bo-ra's photograph. This leads to a short-term offer of a job to Bo-ra.

Cast

Main
Kim Jun-myeon as Lee Yoo-chan
A genius programmer who is also the CEO of gaming company, "Next In". He has a facial recognition disability, and thus cannot recognize the woman he loves.
Ha Yeon-soo as Kim Bo-ra 
A jobless college graduate who dreams of working at "Next In.” She has a positive attitude and an excellent memory.  
Oh Chang-seok as Min Tae-joo
Vice president of "Next In". He is gentle and warm. 
Kim Ye-won as Min Tae-ra
Younger sister of Tae-joo. A gallery curator.

Supporting

Next In staff 
 Jung Yo-han as Steve Jo, an employee at “Next In.” He's known for his lighthearted, joking attitude and his random comments in perfect English.
 Choi Kwang-il as Nam Chul-woo (Administration Director)
 Park Sung-hoon as Cha Do-jin (Programmer). Seemingly narcissistic but opens up gradually. Ends up married.
 Lee Jae-jin as Kang Chan-soo (Management Team employee)
 Kim Ian as Jang Do-il (New Development Team leader)
 Gong Seo-young as Oh Se-yeon (Yoo-Chan's secretary)

People around Yoo-Chan 
 Kim Min-ji as Kim Boon-hong
 Yoo-chan's first love and Bo-ra's life mentor
 Park Hyun-woo as Michael
 Friend who grew up with Yoo-chan in an orphanage.

People around Bo-ra 
 Yun Da-yeong as Park Mi-so (Bo-ra's college friend and roommate)
 Kim Jung-pal as Kim Il-goo (Bo-ra's father)
 Hwang Young-hee as Jo Yeon-shil (Bo-ra's mother)
 Sung Byung-suk as Park Kkot-bun (Bo-ra's grandmother)
 Park Won-suk as Kim Bo-sung (Bo-ra's brother)

Others 
Choi Ji-na as Jung Young-suk (Vice Minister of Science and Technology)
 Lee Tae-vin as Lee Jae-young

Production 

 First script reading took place on March 23.
 Filming began on March 26.

Original soundtrack

Part 1

Part 2

Part 3

Part 4

Part 5

Part 6

Part 7

Part 8

Ratings 
In the table below, the blue numbers represent the lowest ratings and the red numbers represent the highest ratings.
TNmS stopped their ratings since June, 2018.

References

External links 
 Rich Man official Dramax website
 Rich Man official MBN website

 

2018 South Korean television series debuts
Maeil Broadcasting Network television dramas
South Korean romantic comedy television series
South Korean television series based on Japanese television series
Television series by IHQ (company)
Dramax television dramas
2018 South Korean television series endings